Amauroderma floriformum is a polypore fungus in the family Ganodermataceae. It was described as a new species in 2015 by mycologists Allyne Christina Gomes-Silva, Leif Ryvarden, and Tatiana Gibertoni. The specific epithet floriformum (from the Latin words flos = flower and forma = shape) refers to the flower-shaped fruit body. A. floriformum is found in the state of Pará, in the Brazilian Amazon.

References

floriformum
Fungi described in 2015
Fungi of Brazil
Taxa named by Leif Ryvarden